Rik Dobson, who is known by the stage name Otm Shank, is a British electronic music producer based in Los Angeles. He owns Pinkturban, a record label based in Los Angeles.

Dobson's music combines elements of tech house and techno with Indian classical music, in particular, the Indian hand drum tabla, which he studies with his guru, Debasish Chaudhuri, nephew of internationally renowned tabla player, Swapan Chaudhuri.

Career 
In November 2015, Dobson released his debut single, Ravish, via Pinkturban. The track premiered on Nemone's Electric Ladyland on BBC Radio 6 Music. Since then, his music has received airplay internationally on radio stations including 5FM, George FM, and BBC Asian Network.

In 2021, Dobson released his debut full length studio album, Who is Otm Shank?. Following the album, he collaborated with several artists on a remix EP including critically acclaimed British tabla player and music producer, Talvin Singh (Mercury Music Prize winner / OBE).

Discography

Singles and EPs 
 2015: Ravish
 2017: Bounce EP
 2018: Kaida
 2018: So Bazaar
 2021: Who?
 2021: Otm
 2021: Dirt
 2021: Baya
 2021: Tamdrin
 2021: Maharaja
 2021: Genie
 2021: Rani
 2021: Biryani
 2021: Rela
 2021: Dirt (Evan Hatfield Remix)
 2021: Biryani (Jey Kurmis Remix)
 2021: Maharaja (Talvin Singh Remix)
 2021: Who is Otm Shank? (Remixes)
 2022: Powder

Remixes 
 2021: Evan Hatfield - It's Midnight (Otm Shank Remix)

Studio Albums 
 2021: Who is Otm Shank?

References

External links
 Otm Shank website
 Pinkturban website
 Otm Shank on Instagram
 Pinkturban on Instagram

Living people
English record producers
Record producers from Los Angeles
Year of birth missing (living people)